Thermomarinilinea is a bacteria genus from the family of Anaerolineaceae with one known species (Thermomarinilinea lacunofontalis).

References

Monotypic bacteria genera
Chloroflexota
Bacteria genera